Pittsburgh Riverhounds SC is an American professional soccer team based in Pittsburgh, Pennsylvania, founded in 1998 and beginning play in 1999.

Saint Lucian international David Flavius currently holds the club records for most appearances and goals which he set over his eight seasons with the Riverhounds between 1999 and 2006.

The list encompasses the player statistics and records and notable match results since the club's founding.

Player records

Appearances

Bold denotes players still playing for the club.

Goals

Bold denotes players still playing for the club.

All-time roster

Notable match results

U.S. Open Cup

versus Major League Soccer

Frank B. Fuhrer International Friendly Series
In summer 2013, the Riverhounds introduced the Frank B. Fuhrer International Friendly Series, an intended annual international friendly match pitting the Riverhounds against top clubs from around the world. The series was named after investor and local businessman Frank B. Fuhrer, who was also former owner of the Pittsburgh Spirit indoor soccer team. The first edition of the series was held on July 19, 2013 as the Riverhounds fell 1–4 against reigning FA Cup holders Wigan Athletic. Despite being announced as an annual event, only one match has been held.

Keystone Derby Cup

Although they had been rivals and competed against each other in previous seasons, the inaugural Keystone Derby was officially contested between the Riverhounds and Penn FC in 2015. Pittsburgh went on to win the cup in the first edition of the tournament with a head-to-head record of three wins and one loss.

Key
  Won
  Lost

References

Pittsburgh Riverhounds SC
Soccer clubs in Pittsburgh
Association football clubs established in 1998
1998 establishments in Pennsylvania